Towle Glacier is a glacier in the Convoy Range of Victoria Land, draining northeast between Eastwind and Elkhorn Ridges into the Fry Glacier. It was first mapped in 1957 by the New Zealand Northern Survey Party of the Commonwealth Trans-Antarctic Expedition (1956–58) and named for the USNS Private John R. Towle, an American freighter which carried a large proportion of the New Zealand stores south in December 1956.

Glaciers of Scott Coast